Addie Worth Bagley Daniels (née Adelaide Worth Bagley; May 1, 1869 - December 19, 1943) was an American suffragist leader and writer. She attended the Eighth Conference of the International Woman Suffrage Alliance in 1920 as the US delegate, the appointee of President Woodrow Wilson, upon the recommendation of Carrie Chapman Catt.

Personal life

Adelaide Worth Bagley was born May 1, 1869, in Raleigh, North Carolina. Her parents were Major William Henry Bagley and Adelaide Ann Worth. Her mother's father was Jonathan Worth, governor of North Carolina. Worth Bagley and David W. Bagley were her brothers.

She married Josephus Daniels, a newspaper man and leading proponent of the Ku Klux Klan who was a perpetrator of the Wilmington insurrection of 1898 that saw a mob of thousands of white supremacists overthrow an elected government and expel black residents and political leaders. He also served as Secretary of the Navy under Woodrow Wilson and Ambassador to Mexico during the presidency of Franklin D. Roosevelt. Their son, Jonathan W. Daniels, was a White House Press Secretary. 

Daniels died in Raleigh in 1943. The following year, the government commissioned the SS Addie B. Daniels.

Selected works

1920, "The Justice, Expediency and Inevitableness of Ratification", Everywoman's Magazine
1945, Recollections of a Cabinet Minister's Wife 1913-1921

References

Bibliography

American suffragists
1869 births
1943 deaths
20th-century American non-fiction writers
Addie
Writers from North Carolina
Writers from Raleigh, North Carolina
Activists from North Carolina
20th-century American women writers
American women non-fiction writers